Bartłomiej Nowodworski High School (I Liceum Ogólnokształcące im. Bartłomieja Nowodworskiego; unofficially known as: Nowodworek) in Kraków, Poland is one of the oldest secondary schools in Poland. Its current location is on Na Groblach Square, just across the Planty from the Kraków Old Town and a few hundred meters from Wawel Castle.

History
The Senate of the Jagiellonian University decided to establish a school preparing students (boys only)  for further education at the university level on 5 May 1586. The school was opened in 1588.  Bartłomiej (Bartholomew) Nowodworski (born ca. 1552, died 13 February 1625), Polish nobleman, courtier and officer, endowed it in 1617 and 1619, thus enabling its further expansion. In recognition of  his contribution, the school became known as Collegium Nowodworskiego, renamed to Liceum św. Anny (St. Anne's Lyceum) in 1818, and to c.k. Gimnazjum św. Anny (Imperial and Royal St. Anne's Gymnasium) in 1850.  In 1898 the school, until then located in the university area, moved to its present building in Plac na Groblach (architect Józef Sare).

Girls were admitted to the school for the first time in 1962.

School's traditions

Nowodworski Choir
In 1986 as the 400th anniversary of the school was coming close (1988) many of the old school's traditions were reactivated. One of   them was Nowodworski Choir. The first supervisor was Zbigniew Toffel, and since 1992 the conductor has been Ryszard Źróbek.

Nowodworski Nativity Satirical Show
It is an annual tradition, usually just before the Christmas  break, that the pupils prepare the "Nowodworian Crib" : a Comedy show showing the school life in a satirical way. The actors parody their teachers and often some memorable school happenings; sometimes you can find allusions to the current political and cultural situation in Poland and in the World. All the students, teachers and former pupils make the audience. It was first shown in 1963, initially as a secret from the teachers, but soon became a yearly tradition looked forward to by students, as well as by teachers.

Famous alumni
Jan III Sobieski – King of Poland, military leader of European forces at the Battle of Vienna in 1683
Stanisław Trembecki – poet of the Polish Enlightenment
Jan Śniadecki – scientist of the Polish Enlightenment
Jędrzej Śniadecki – chemist, doctor, biologist, philosopher
Wojciech Bogusławski – "Father of Polish theatre"; director of the Polish National Theatre
Józef Bem – Independence fighter, general of the Polish and Hungarian Army
Joseph Conrad – writer; author of famous novels, such as Heart of Darkness and The Secret Agent
Stefan Banach – mathematician (creator of functional analysis)
Józef Kenig – journalist, publicist, editor of Gazeta Warszawska
Władysław Ludwik Anczyc – poet, playwright
Jan Matejko – painter of Polish historical scenes and portraits of all the Polish kings
Józef Mehoffer – painter and decorative artist
Stanisław Wyspiański – playwright, painter and poet
Michał Bałucki – playwright and poet
Kazimierz Przerwa-Tetmajer – poet, novelist
Lucjan Rydel – poet
Tadeusz Boy-Żeleński – critic, journalist, Mloda Polska satirist, translator
Ignacy Daszyński – politician, journalist and Prime Minister in 1918
Leon Schiller – theatre and film director
Adam Pragier - leading socialist politician, member of the Sejm, minister in exile, publicist and writer
Jozef Retinger - linguist, geopolitician, adviser to the Polish government-in-exile, co-founder of various European institutions
Kazimierz Nitsch – historian and linguist, professor of Jagiellonian University and Lwow University
Juliusz Osterwa – theatre actor and director
Gustaw Holoubek – actor and director, member of The Polish Parliament and The Senate.
Walery Goetel – geologist and palaeontologist; researcher of geological structure of the Tatra Mountains
Sławomir Mrożek – dramatist and writer
Antoni Kępiński – psychiatrist; known for information metabolism and axiological psychiatry
Michał Rola-Żymierski Marshall
Roman Młodkowski – journalist and co-founder of Polish news television TVN24
Wawrzyniec Styczeń – social activist, lawyer, and president of the Kraków branch of Sokół
Jerzy Vetulani – pharmacologist and biochemist
Andrzej Trybulec – mathematician, founder of MIZAR formalization system
Agata Kornhauser-Duda – First Lady of Poland 
Adam Buksa - footballer, forward at New England Revolution

See also
Education
Lyceum
Jan III Sobieski High School in Kraków

References

External links
The official school  website
The Nowodworski Foundation

High schools in Poland
Education in Kraków
Educational institutions established in the 1580s